The Tashkent Military District, also known as the Tashkent Operational Command is a military district of the Armed Forces of the Republic of Uzbekistan based in the capital city of Tashkent. It serves the territory of the Tashkent Region and the Sirdaryo Region. In accordance with the resolution of the Cabinet of Ministers on 9 January 2001 and the resolution of the Minister of Defense on 12 January 2001, the Tashkent military district was created.

Structure
The District has over a dozen battalions and brigades troops assigned to the district and consisted of the following formations:

 General Staff of the Armed Forces
 Honor Guard Battalion of the Tashkent Military District
Ground Forces Honor Guard
Naval Honor Guard
Air Forces Honor Guard
 Engineering Brigade
 Special Forces Brigade
 Separate Reconnaissance Battalion
 National Guard Brigade
 Special Purpose Brigade "Kalkon" ("Shield")
 Material Support Battalion 
 Andijan Special Forces Battalion (Andijan)
 1st Motor Rifle Brigade (Chirchik)
 37th Motor Rifle Brigade (Andijan)
 1st Separate Special Purpose Battalion   
 1 Communications Platoon
 1 Material Support Platoon
 Communications Company
 Repair Company
 Physician Company
  Band of the Ministry of Defense of the Republic of Uzbekistan
 Band of the Tashkent Military District
 "Tiger" Brigade 
 "Bars" of the Ministry of Internal Affairs of the Republic of Uzbekistan
 Jaguar Brigade of the National Security Service of the Republic of Uzbekistan
 "Burgut" of the National Security Service of the Republic of Uzbekistan
 Training Regiment (Chirchik)

Leadership
The following people manage the activities of the district:

 Commander of District – Colonel Zokirjon Sayfudinov
 First Deputy Commander/Chief of Staff – Colonel Shokir Khairov
 Deputy Commander for Logistics – Otabek Abdurakhmonov
 Deputy Commander of the Armament Command – Oybek Ismoilov
 Deputy Commander for Combat Training – Shukhratjon Otakuzyev
 Deputy Commander for Patriotic, Spiritual and Moral Education with Youth – Bakhtiyor Uralbaev

List of commanders 

 Colonel General Bahodir Tashmatov (2 May 2001 – 17 May 2005)
 Major General Akmaljon Kamilov (22 June 2005 – 9 October 2008)
 Lieutenant General Viktor Makhmudov (9 October 2008 – 9 June 2010)
 Colonel Rustam Khalilov (3 June 2010 – 25 July 2012)
 Colonel Lutfullo Buzrukov (26 July 2012 – 13 January 2018)
 Major General Bakhodir Kurbanov (13 February 2018 – 11 February 2019)
Colonel Zokirjon Sayfudinov (since 21 March 2019)

Links
 Official Website (in Russian)
 Official Website (in Uzbek Latin)
 Official Website (in Uzbek Cyrillic)

References

Military units and formations of Uzbekistan
Military units and formations established in 2001
2001 establishments in Uzbekistan